Manon is an opera by Jules Massenet, adapted from Abbé Prévost's novel Manon Lescaut.

Manon may also refer to:

Fiction and art

Prévost's character
Manon Lescaut, the fictional title character of Manon Lescaut, a 1731 novel by French author Abbé Prévost
Le portrait de Manon (1894), Massenet's sequel
 Manon (film), a 1949 French film by Henri-Georges Clouzot, adapted from Manon Lescaut
 Manon 70, a 1968 French film based on Manon Lescaut
 L'histoire de Manon, a 1974 ballet set to the music of Massenet, with choreography by Sir Kenneth MacMillan

Other characters
 Manon (character), a fictional character from children's books, and related media, by Gerard Moncomble and Nadine Rouviere
 Manon, the fictional title character of the 1962 novel Manon des sources, by Marcel Pagnol, and subsequent adaptations
 Manon des Sources (1986 film), a French film, released in North America as Manon of the Spring
 Manon, the fictional godlike deity ascribed to Wicca in the film The Craft
 Manon Blackbeak Crochan, a fictional character in the series Throne of Glass by Sarah J Maas
 Manon, a fictional French ballerina, judoka champion, and celebrity to be introduced in the upcoming Street Fighter 6

People 
 Gloria Manon (born 1939), American actress
 Manon (artist) (born Rosmarie Küng 1946), Swiss artist
 Christian Manon (born 1950), French-Australian actor
 Julio Mañón (born 1973), Dominican baseball pitcher
 Lydia Manon (born 1982), American figure skater
 Víctor Mañon (born 1992), Mexican football player 

 Manon (given name), including a list of people with the name

Places 
 Mañón, a city council of Ferrolterra in the province of A Coruña, Spain
 Sor Mañón, a river in Galicia, Spain

See also 
 Manon Lescaut (disambiguation)
 Mannon (disambiguation)
 Manan (disambiguation)